The 2018 WGC-Mexico Championship was a golf tournament played March 1–4 at Club de Golf Chapultepec in Naucalpan, Mexico, just west of Mexico City. It was the 19th time the WGC Championship was played, and the first of the World Golf Championships events to be staged in 2018. The approximate elevation of the course's clubhouse is  

Phil Mickelson won the tournament on the first playoff hole; it was his first tour victory in over 4½ years, since The Open Championship in 2013.

Course layout
Club de Golf Chapultepec

Source:

Field
The field consisted of players from the top of the Official World Golf Ranking and the money lists/Orders of Merit from the six main professional golf tours. Each player is classified according to the first category in which he qualified, but other categories are shown in parentheses.

1. The top 50 players from the Official World Golf Ranking, as of February 19, 2018
Kiradech Aphibarnrat (2,5), Daniel Berger (2,3), Rafa Cabrera-Bello (2,5), Patrick Cantlay (2,3), Paul Casey (2,3), Kevin Chappell (2,3), Jason Dufner (2,3), Tony Finau (2,3,4), Ross Fisher (2,5,6), Matt Fitzpatrick (2,5), Tommy Fleetwood (2,5,6), Rickie Fowler (2,3), Dylan Frittelli (2,5,6), Sergio García (2,3,5), Branden Grace (2,5), Adam Hadwin (2,3), Brian Harman (2,3), Tyrrell Hatton (2,5), Charley Hoffman (2,3), Yuta Ikeda (2), Dustin Johnson (2,3,4), Kevin Kisner (2,3), Satoshi Kodaira (2,7), Matt Kuchar (2,3), Li Haotong (2,5,6), Marc Leishman (2,3), Phil Mickelson (2), Francesco Molinari (2,5), Alex Norén (2,5), Louis Oosthuizen (2), Pat Perez (2,3,4), Thomas Pieters (2,5), Jon Rahm (2,3,4,5), Chez Reavie (2,4), Patrick Reed (2,3), Justin Rose (2,3,5), Xander Schauffele (2,3), Charl Schwartzel (2), Webb Simpson (2,3), Jordan Spieth (2,3), Brendan Steele (2,4), Justin Thomas (2,3,4), Jhonattan Vegas (2,3), Bubba Watson (2), Gary Woodland (2,3,4)
Brooks Koepka (2,3) did not play due to injury.
Jason Day (2,3,4), Hideki Matsuyama (2,3), Rory McIlroy (2,5,6), and Henrik Stenson (2,5) did not play.

2. The top 50 players from the Official World Golf Ranking, as of February 26, 2018

3. The top 30 players from the final 2017 FedExCup Points List
Russell Henley, Kyle Stanley

4. The top 10 players from the 2018 FedExCup Points List, as of February 26, 2018
Patton Kizzire

5. The top 20 players from the final 2017 European Tour Race to Dubai
Paul Dunne, Peter Uihlein, Bernd Wiesberger

6. The top 10 players from the 2018 European Tour Race to Dubai, as of February 19, 2018
Jorge Campillo, Joost Luiten, Wade Ormsby, Chris Paisley, Shubhankar Sharma

7. The top 2 players not exempt from the final 2017 Japan Golf Tour Order of Merit
Yūsaku Miyazato

Chan Kim did not play due to a wrist injury.

8. The top 2 players from the final 2017 PGA Tour of Australasia Order of Merit
Adam Bland, Brett Rumford

9. The top 2 players from the final 2017 Sunshine Tour Order of Merit
Dean Burmester, Brandon Stone

10. The top 2 players from the final 2017 Asian Tour Order of Merit
Gavin Green, David Lipsky

11. The highest ranked available player from Mexico from the Official World Golf Ranking as of February 19, 2018
Abraham Ancer

Round summaries

First round
Thursday, March 1, 2018

Second round
Friday, March 2, 2018

Third round
Saturday, March 3, 2018

Final round
Sunday, March 4, 2018

Scorecard
Final round

Cumulative tournament scores, relative to par

Source:

Playoff
The playoff started on the par-3 17th hole. From the tee, Thomas went past the green and Mickelson found the putting surface. Thomas left his difficult chip well short, Mickelson just missed his birdie putt and tapped in for par; Thomas missed the par putt he needed to extend the playoff.

References

External links

Coverage on the European Tour's official site

WGC Championship
Golf tournaments in Mexico
Sport in the State of Mexico
Naucalpan de Juárez
WGC-Mexico Championship
WGC-Mexico Championship
WGC-Mexico Championship